Colt Lightning may refer to:

 Colt Lightning Carbine
 Colt Lightning Revolver